Fredrik Logevall is a Swedish-American historian and educator at Harvard University, where he is the Laurence D. Belfer Professor of International Affairs at the John F. Kennedy School of Government and professor of history in the Harvard Faculty of Arts and Sciences. He is a specialist in U.S. politics and foreign policy. Logevall was previously the Stephen and Madeline Anbinder Professor of History at Cornell University, where he also served as vice provost and as director of the Mario Einaudi Center for International Studies. He won the 2013 Pulitzer Prize for History for his book Embers of War: The Fall of an Empire and the Making of America’s Vietnam.  His most recent book, JFK: Coming of Age in the American Century, 1917-1956 (2020), won the Elizabeth Longford Prize for Historical Biography and was a New York Times Notable Book of the Year.

Logevall’s essays and reviews have appeared in The New York Times, The Washington Post, the Los Angeles Times, Politico, Daily Beast, and Foreign Affairs, among other publications.

Biography 
Fredrik Logevall was born in Stockholm, Sweden, in 1963, and grew up in Västerås. He emigrated with his family to Vancouver, British Columbia as a youth and before entering Simon Fraser University.  He went on to earn an MA in history from the University of Oregon and a PhD in U.S. foreign relations history from Yale University, where he studied under Gaddis Smith and Paul Kennedy. He then taught for eleven years at University of California, Santa Barbara, where, with Tsuyoshi Hasegawa, he co-founded the university's Center for Cold War Studies. In 2004, he moved to Cornell University and assumed his present position at Harvard in 2015.

Logevall is a former president of the Society for Historians for American Foreign Relations.

Awards 
Logevall has lectured widely around the world on topics relating to diplomatic history and contemporary U.S. politics and foreign policy, and has won numerous honors for his work. His book, Embers of War: The Fall of an Empire and the Making of America’s Vietnam (2012), received the Pulitzer Prize for History, the Francis Parkman Prize from the Society of American Historians, the Arthur Ross Book Award from the Council on Foreign Relations, and the American Library in Paris Book Award.  His book, JFK: Coming of Age in the American Century, 1917-1956 (2020), won the Elizabeth Longford Prize for Historical Biography.  In addition, for previous studies, Logevall received the Stuart L. Bernath book, article, and lecture prizes as well as the Warren F. Kuehl Book Prize (2001) from the Society for Historians of American Foreign Relations; and the W. Turrentine Jackson Book Award, Pacific Coast Branch, American Historical Association (2000).

Selected works 
Logevall has published numerous books and articles on U.S. foreign policy in the Cold War era, including: 

JFK: Coming of Age in the American Century, 1917-1956 (Random House, 2020).
Embers of War: The Fall of an Empire and the Making of America's Vietnam (Random House, 2012).  Winner of the 2013 Pulitzer Prize; finalist for the 2013 Cundill Prize
A People and A Nation: A History of the United States, 11th ed. (co-authored, Jane Kamensky et al.; Cengage, 2011).
America's Cold War: The Politics of Insecurity (co-authored with Campbell Craig; Belknap Press of Harvard University Press, 2009; paperback February 2012).
Nixon in the World: American Foreign Relations, 1969-1977 (co-edited, with Andrew Preston; Oxford University Press, 2008).
The First Vietnam War: Colonial and Cold War Crisis (co-edited, with Mark A. Lawrence; Harvard University Press, 2007).
Encyclopedia of American Foreign Policy: Studies in the Principal Movements and Ideas, revised ed. (co-edited, with Alexander DeConde and Richard Dean Burns; Scribners, 2002).
Terrorism and 9/11: A Reader (edited; Houghton Mifflin, 2002).
The Origins of the Vietnam War (Longman, 2001).
Choosing War: The Lost Chance for Peace and the Escalation of War in Vietnam (University of California Press, 1999; paperback March 2001).

References

Further reading
  Logevall, Fredrik.  "Contingent Histories" H-DIPLO, March 2, 2021, online, autobiographical essay.
 Pach, Chester; Ewing, Cindy; Kim, Kevin Y.; Bessner, Daniel; Logevall, Fredrik. "A Roundtable on Daniel Bessner and Fredrik Logevall, 'Recentering the United States in the Historiography of American Foreign Relations'" Passport: The Newsletter of the SHAFR (Sept 2020), Vol. 51 Issue 2, pp 39–44

External links

Cornell University faculty
1963 births
Living people
Writers from Stockholm
Writers from Vancouver
Yale University alumni
Swedish emigrants to Canada
Simon Fraser University alumni
University of Oregon alumni
University of California, Santa Barbara faculty
Swedish emigrants to the United States
Pulitzer Prize for History winners
20th-century American historians
American male non-fiction writers
21st-century American historians
21st-century American male writers
Date of birth missing (living people)
Historians of the Vietnam War
20th-century American male writers